Love and Danger is the eleventh solo studio album by American recording artist Kool Keith. It was released on June 5, 2012 via Junkadelic Music and produced entirely by DJ Junkaz Lou, except for two tracks produced by Big Sche Eastwood and Ariel Caban. The project featured guest appearances from Agallah, Keith Murray, Megabone, NYM, The I.M.O., and Mr. Sche.

Track listing

Personnel 

 Keith Matthew Thornton – vocals, executive producer
 Louis Gomis – mixing, producer (tracks: 1-9, 11-15), executive producer
 Jeremie Kantorowicz - executive producer
 Mark A. Dokes – vocals (tracks: 3, 10, 14), producer (track 10)
 Ariel Caban – producer (track 16)
 Julianna – additional vocals (tracks: 1, 9)
 Keith Murray – vocals (track 7)
 Megabone – vocals (track 8)
 The I.M.O – vocals (track 11)
 Angel Aguilar – vocals (track 16)
 Sascha Stadlmeier – vocals (track 16)
 Lyass – piano (track 15)
 Joe Hernandez – recording
 Fabrice "the Lotion Man" Ho-Shui-Ling – mixing
 Hans-Philipp Graf – mastering
 Phil Emerson – layout, photography

References

External links 
 
 

2012 albums
Kool Keith albums